Dapper may refer to:

People
Cliff Dapper (1920–2011), Major League Baseball catcher
Olfert Dapper (1635–1689), Dutch physician and writer
Marco Dapper (born 1983), American actor and model
"Dapper" Danny Hogan (c. 1880–1928), American mob boss
Dapper O'Neil (1920–2007), American politician

Other uses
Musée Dapper, a Parisian museum specializing in African art
Dapper-class gunboat, a Royal Navy class of 20 gunboats built in 1854-1855
"Dapper", a track from the album Genesis by Domo Genesis
Dapper, a character in the 1610 play The Alchemist by Ben Jonson
Dapper ORM, a simple object mapper for .NET Framework

See also
Dapper Dan (disambiguation)
John Gotti (1940-2002), American mob boss known as "The Dapper Don"
Dapper Day, a semi-annual gathering that takes place at the Walt Disney Parks and Resorts

Lists of people by nickname